Yigoban is a small village in Kupwara district of the Indian union territory of Jammu and Kashmir.

See also
 Lolab Valley
 Tulail Valley

References

Villages in Kupwara district